is a passenger railway station located in the city of  Katō, Hyōgo Prefecture, Japan, operated by West Japan Railway Company (JR West).

Lines
Takino Station is served by the Kakogawa Line and is 27.3 kilometers from the terminus of the line at

Station layout
The station consists of one ground-level side platform serving bi-directional track. The station is unattended.

History
It was renamed it its present name when the line was nationalized on 1 June 1943. With the privatization of the Japan National Railways (JNR) on 1 April 1987, the station came under the aegis of the West Japan Railway Company.

Passenger statistics
In fiscal 2019, the station was used by an average of 265 passengers daily

Surrounding area
 Toryunada Rapids
Komyo-ji
Hyogo Prefectural Harima Central Park

See also
List of railway stations in Japan

References

External links

  

Railway stations in Hyōgo Prefecture
Railway stations in Japan opened in 1913
Katō, Hyōgo